Beechwold Chester (foaled 1906) was a stallion owned by the United States Army Remount for breeding purposes. 

Beechwold Chester was an American Saddlebred descended from Denmark. He was foaled in 1906 by Molly Nicoll, and sired by Happy Dare II.

From 1913 to 1917 Beechwold Chester was posted to Leitchfield, Kentucky. There, he earned a solid reputation as a sire and was featured in a number of articles in horse enthusiast publications.

See also
 United States Cavalry

References

Individual American Saddlebreds
Individual warhorses
1906 animal births